Saurolophini is a tribe of saurolophine hadrosaurids native to the Americas and Asia. It includes Saurolophus (from Canada and Mongolia), Augustynolophus (from the United States), and Prosaurolophus (from Alberta, Canada, and Montana, U.S.). Kerberosaurus and Kundurosaurus may also be members. Bonapartesaurus, a hadrosaurid from Argentina, also has been identified as a member of this tribe.

Fossils of saurolophins have been found in Canada, the United States and Asia, with the North American fossils being older than the Asian, suggesting saurolophins migrated intra-continentally.

See also
 Timeline of hadrosaur research

References

Saurolophines
Fossil taxa described in 1989